Trincomalee massacre can refer to number of incidents of massacres of civilians in the Trincomalee district of Sri Lanka during the duration of the Sri Lankan civil war.

1987 Trincomalee massacre
1995 Trincomalee massacre also known as Kumarapuram massacre
2006 Trincomalee massacre
2006 Trincomalee massacre of NGO workers also known as Muttur massacre

Massacres in Sri Lanka